Below is a list of squads used in the 1978 African Cup of Nations.

Group A

Ghana
Coach: Fred Osam-Duodu

Nigeria
Coach:  Tihomir Jelisavčić

Upper Volta
Coach:  Otto Pfister

Zambia
Coach:  Brian Tiler

Group B

Congo
Coach:  Maurice Ondzola

Morocco
Coach:  Gheorghe Mărdărescu

Tunisia
Coach: Abdelmajid Chetali

Uganda
Coach: Peter Okee

Henry Matte was part of that squad. from Express team.

References

External links
football mundial
Ghana squad on Ghana Home Page
FIFA

squads